Voster ATS Team is a Polish UCI Continental cycling team founded in 2016. It obtained a UCI Continental licence in 2017.

Team roster

Major wins
2017
Overall Course Cycliste de Solidarnosc et des Champions Olympiques, Mateusz Komar
Stage 4, Mateusz Komar
2019
Overall Belgrade Banjaluka, Paweł Franczak
Visegrad 4 Kerekparverseny, Paweł Franczak
Stages 1 & 3 Bałtyk–Karkonosze Tour, Paweł Franczak
Overall Tour of Małopolska, Adam Stachowiak
Stage 3, Adam Stachowiak
Grand Prix Doliny Baryczy migród - XXIX Memoria Grundmanna i Wizowskiego, Sylwester Janiszewski
2020
  Overall Tour of Bulgaria, Patryk Stosz
Stage 2, Patryk Stosz
2021
Stage 2 Belgrade Banjaluka, Patryk Stosz
Stage 2 Tour of Małopolska, Patryk Stosz
Stage 1 Course de Solidarność et des Champions Olympiques, Patryk Stosz
 Overall Szlakiem Grodów Piastowskich, Maciej Paterski
Stage 1, Patryk Stosz
Stage 2, Maciej Paterski
Stage 2 & 5 Tour of Romania, Patryk Stosz
Stage 4 Circuit des Ardennes, Patryk Stosz
2022 
GP Adria Mobil, Maciej Paterski

National champions
2021
 Poland Road Race, Maciej Paterski

References

External links

UCI Continental Teams (Europe)
Cycling teams established in 2016
Cycling teams based in Poland